António Manuel Mateus Antunes (born 30 December, 1963), known professionally as Tony Carreira, is a Portuguese singer and musician. Born in the small rural locality of Armadouro, Pampilhosa da Serra, he moved to Paris at age 10 with his emigrant parents. He lived there for 20 years. Carreira has had several hits since 1991, becoming during the 2000s one of the most renowned and best-selling popular singers in his home country. Tony Carreira has performed sold out concerts in one of the largest venues in Portugal, the Pavilhão Atlântico in Lisbon, and also at the Olympia in Paris.

O Homem Que Sou has been certified seven times platinum in Portugal. Up to 2009, he sold over 700,000 records in Portugal.

Nos fiançailles France/Portugal, released in February 2014, includes duets with several French artists such as Natasha St-Pier, Vincent Niclo, Gérard Lenorman, Michel Sardou, Dany Brillant, Serge Lama, Anggun, Didier Barbelivien, Lisa Angell and Hélène Ségara.

The album Sempre  was released in 2014.

His most recent album, Mon Fado, was released in 2016.

Tony Carreira is the father of three children: Sara Carreira, a TV personality and singer, killed in a car crash on December 5, 2020, and the pop singers David Carreira and Mickael Carreira.

Discography

Albums
Studio albums
 1991 É Verão Portugal (Discossete)
 1992 Canta Canta Portugal (Discossete)
 1993 Português De Alma E Coração (Espacial)
 1994 Adeus Amigo (Espacial)
 1995 Ai Destino (Espacial)
 1996 Adeus Até Um Dia (Espacial)
 1997 Coração Perdido (Espacial)
 1998 Sonhador, Sonhador (Espacial)
 1999 Dois Corações Sozinhos (Espacial)
 2001 Cantor de Sonhos (Espacial)
 2002 Passionita Lolita (POMME)
 2004 Vagabundo Por Amor (Espacial)
 2006 A Vida Que Eu Escolhi (Espacial)
 2008 O Homem Que Sou (Farol)
 2010 O Mesmo de Sempre (Farol)
 2014 Nos fiançailles France/Portugal (Sony Music Smart)
 2013 Sempre (Farol)
 2016 Mon fado (Sony Music Smart)
 2017 Sempre Mais (Sony Music Portugal)
 2017 Le Coeur des Femmes (Sony Music France et Smart)
 2018 As Canções das nossas vidas - acoustic (Sony Music Portugal et Regi-concerto lda)

Compilation albums
 2008 Best Of 20 Anos de Canções (Espacial)
 2010 Reste - Best Of
 2011 Best Of 20 Anos de Canções Vol. 2 (Espacial)
 2012 Essencial (Farol)

Live albums
 2000 Ao Vivo No Olympia (Espacial)
 2003 15 anos de Canções - Ao Vivo No Pavilhão Atlântico (Espacial)
 2008 Ao Vivo No Coliseu (Espacial)
 2013 Tony Carreira 25 Anos (Farol)

International charting

Singles

Controversies
In August 2008, the Portuguese Society of Authors (SPA) announced that it had received several complaints about possible plagiarism by Tony Carreira. The complaints related to three songs: "Depois de Ti (Mais Nada)", "Ai Destino, Ai Destino" and "Leva-me ao Céu". SPA concluded that the song "Depois de Ti (Mais Nada)", is an apparent unauthorized copy of the song "Después de Ti...¿Qué?", composed by Rudy Pérez and first performed by José Feliciano. No action was taken however because SPA had not received an official complaint from the rights owners, who were represented by Universal Music Publishing. According to Universal Music the matter was "under investigation". In 2017, Tony Carreira was formally accused of plagiarism by the Portuguese Public Prosecution Service.

References

External links
 Official website

1963 births
Living people
20th-century Portuguese male singers
Portuguese songwriters
Male songwriters
21st-century Portuguese male singers
People from Pampilhosa da Serra